Dracu may refer to the following rivers in Romania:

Dracu, a tributary of the Baleia in Hunedoara County 
Dracu, a tributary of the Olteț in Gorj County
Dracu, a tributary of the Tărlung in Brașov County

See also 
 Dracul (disambiguation)
 Dracula (disambiguation)
 Drăculea (disambiguation)
 Valea Dracului (disambiguation)